Ngagane is a town in Amajuba District Municipality in the KwaZulu-Natal province of South Africa.

Town some 11 km north of Alcockspruit and 35 km south-west of Utrecht. Of Zulu origin, the name is variously said to mean ‘the unexpected one’, referring to the way the river may suddenly come down in flood; ‘thorn-tree river’, referring to Dichrostachys or Acacia trees growing along the banks, or ‘skeleton river’, the reference being uncertain.

References

Populated places in the Newcastle Local Municipality